Kurimoto (written: 栗本) is a Japanese surname. Notable people with the surname include:

, pen name of Sumiyo Imaoka, Japanese writer
, Japanese naturalist, zoologist and entomologist
, Japanese writer and politician

See also
Kurimoto, Chiba, a former town in Katori District, Chiba Prefecture, Japan

Japanese-language surnames